Dung Kai-cheung, a Chinese-language fiction writer born in Hong Kong in 1967. He received his B.A. and M. Phil. in comparative literature from the University of Hong Kong.
He is an author, journalist, playwright, and essayist. He has been described as Hong Kong’s most accomplished writer. He works as a part-time lecturer at The Chinese University of Hong Kong and mainly teaches Chinese writing. His wife, Wong Nim Yan works as associate professor at the Chinese department of The Chinese University of Hong Kong. His most important novels include "Atlas," "Histories of Time" and other award-winning books.  “Atlas” is the first of his novels to have been translated into English and Japanese. Unlike other local Chinese writers, Dung translates his work into English versions. Dung is devoted to the education of young writers. He writes prefaces and prologues for young Hong Kong writers, some of whom are his students in the Chinese department of the Chinese University of Hong Kong.

Life and career
"Atlas" is the long-lost city of Victoria was Inspired by the rich history of Hong Kong; he believes Hong Kong was created by the British. The fictitious or created nature of Hong Kong made it a city that was wonderfully open to challenge and innovation. Dung claims that this advantage has declined since the return of Hong Kong to China, a historical event that was supposed to have ended the city's rootlessness.
Hong Kong has always been the center of Dung Kai-Cheung's writing world, or more generally, it is the place where he lives and survives, and it is the existence of Hong Kong that makes his writing possible.
"V" is the initials of The City of Victoria, which was located on the northwest shore of Hong Kong Island (divided into the fourth ring Road in 1857) immediately after a British colony occupied Hong Kong in 1841. It represents the beginning of Hong Kong's urban history. It extends its roots to form the steel forest of today's Hong Kong. (Made in Hong Kong: On the Writing of City in Dung Kai Cheung's “Series of V City”)
The original publications of the four books are as follows:
“Atlas: The archaeology of an imaginary city”, June 1997.
“Visible Cities (in Mandarin: FAN ShengLu)”, October 1998.
“The Catalog (in Mandarin: Meng HuaLu, author Kai), July 1999.
“BoWuZhi”, November 1999.

Influences
Dung's writings were heavily influenced by the older generation of Hong Kong writers, including Liu Yi Chang, Leung Ping Kwan, and Xi Xi, who he claims were his most important sources of inspiration and models for aspiration. Their works are representative of Hong Kong literature in terms of language, literary forms, and subject matter.
 
On the influence of the English language, Dung studied Comparative Literature at the University of Hong Kong, and much of his readings were done in English. The influence went beyond the subject matter and literary forms but also of sentence structure and diction. To many language purists, Dung's Chinese has been regarded as "Europeanised."

Beloved Wife
The novel Beloved Wife has been deemed as Dung's most-strikingly experimental works with the attempt of trying to renegotiate the relationship between man and machines. With the novel's focus on AI, Dung believes that one day they might outnumber the human population and actually replace humans by being better at what they do. In his novels, he imagines AIs as having a human body in which the consciousness is connected to or replaced by an AI-like technology. His view resonated with Martin Heidegger's idea of 'wordling', (Being and Time, 1927), whereby the world is not something out there, objectively there, or somewhere ideally there, and we set off to find it. The world is the thing that we live in and created by our experience. If humans learn things like that, AI can also learn this way and not be fed information on ideal things.

Awards
 Hong Kong Arts Development Council Rookie Award (1997)
 2008 Hong Kong Art Development Award」Best Artist of the year (Literature) (2008)
 Best Translated Work Award-Science Fiction & Fantasy Translation Awards (2013) for "Atlas" Atlas depicts an imaginary city that is set in Victoria, a fictional city similar to Hong Kong. The story reflects the colonial past of Hong Kong, it was an extraordinary social critique.
 Hong Kong Book Fair Author of the Year (2014)
 2017 Hong Kong Book Award
 2018 Hong Kong Book Award
 2019 Taipei International Book Exhibition

Works

Short story collections and novels
 The Souvenir Album (1995)
 Xiaodong Campus (1996） 
 The Family Curriculum (1996）
 Andrew Jenney (1996）
 Evolution of a Nonexistent Species (1996)
 Atlas: The Archaeology of an Imaginary City (1996)
 The Double Body (1997)
 The Rose of the Name (1997)
 The Storyteller (1997)
 Visible Cities (1998)
 The Catalog (1999)
 A Brief History of the Silverfish (2002)
 The History of the Adventures of Vivi and Vera (2005)
 Heavenly Creations, Lifelike (2005)
 Histories of Time (2007) 
 The Age of Learning (2010)

References

 "Interview with Dung Kai-cheung"
 "Renegotiating poetic license"
 "Interview with Dung Kai-cheung"
 "Made in Hong Kong: On the writing of city in Dung Kai Cheung's Series of V city"

External links
 "Why should this book win: Atlas by Dung Kai-Cheung"
 "Atlas: The Archaeology of an Imaginary City by Dung Kai-Cheung"
 "How do I write: YouTube video"
"Lucas Klein on Dung Kai-cheung’s Atlas"
"To write the unwritable: contesting Dung Kai-Cheung from within"

1967 births
Living people
Chinese essayists
Hong Kong journalists
Alumni of the University of Hong Kong
Hong Kong novelists
Chinese male short story writers
International Writing Program alumni